West Davis Street–Fountain Place Historic District is a national historic district located at Burlington, Alamance County, North Carolina. It encompasses 138 contributing buildings in a primarily middle-class residential section of Burlington.  Most of the dwellings date to the late-19th and early-20th century and include representative examples of Queen Anne and Colonial Revival style architecture.

It was added to the National Register of Historic Places in 1984.

References

Historic districts on the National Register of Historic Places in North Carolina
Queen Anne architecture in North Carolina
Colonial Revival architecture in North Carolina
Buildings and structures in Burlington, North Carolina
National Register of Historic Places in Alamance County, North Carolina